UFC Fight Night: Woodley vs. Edwards was a planned mixed martial arts event produced by the Ultimate Fighting Championship originally planned to take place on March 21, 2020, at The O2 Arena in London, England. Due to the COVID-19 pandemic, the event was eventually postponed (see section below).

Background
The event was originally expected to take place at The O2 Arena in London, England. However, due to the COVID-19 pandemic causing a travel ban including the United Kingdom, UFC president Dana White announced on March 15 that the event would have to move to a new location to be decided and some of the fights scheduled might be affected.

A welterweight bout between former UFC Welterweight Champion Tyron Woodley and Leon Edwards was expected to serve as the event headliner. However, Edwards pulled out on March 15 due to the cancellation of the event in London.

While not officially announced by the organization, a lightweight bout between Stevie Ray and Marc Diakiese was expected to take place at the event. However, Ray was removed from the card in late January for undisclosed reasons. Diakiese was expected to remain on the card against promotional newcomer Jai Herbert.

A heavyweight bout between Raphael Pessoa and Tom Aspinall was scheduled for the event. However, Pessoa was replaced by Jake Collier for an undisclosed reason.

COVID-19 pandemic
After the event was pulled from London, UFC president Dana White announced that the plan was to move the card somewhere stateside. That prompted cancellations in several bouts expected to take place at this event, including the main event. Cage Warriors (a mixed martial arts promotion based in London) president Graham Boylan indicated that he would like to help some of these bouts to happen in his promotion's event scheduled for March 20. On March 16, it was confirmed that the event was postponed after a letter from White to employees was shared to the public. This was the first time that the promotion was forced to cancel events due to vis major. The UFC also cancelled two events scheduled for March 28 and April 11. White assured on March 24 that all cancelled fights would be rescheduled for future events. It was announced on April 1 that all fighters that were scheduled to appear at the event would be paid.

Cancelled fight card

See also 

 List of UFC events
 List of current UFC fighters
 2020 in UFC

References 

UFC Fight Night
2020 in mixed martial arts
2020 sports events in London
Sports competitions in London
Mixed martial arts in the United Kingdom
March 2020 sports events in the United Kingdom
Cancelled Ultimate Fighting Championship events
Sports events cancelled due to the COVID-19 pandemic